General elections were held in Grenada on 7 December 1976. The result was a victory for the Grenada United Labour Party of Eric Gairy, which won nine of the 15 seats, whilst the opposition People's Alliance (a coalition of the New Jewel Movement, the Grenada National Party and the United People's Party won the remainder. However, the elections were marred by fraud (and branded fraudulent by international observers), as Gairy's secret police, known as the Mongoose Gang, had been threatening the opposition. Voter turnout was 65.2%.

Three years later Gairy was overthrown by the New Jewel Movement, a move which was supported by the majority of the population.

Results

References

Elections in Grenada
General
Grenada
Grenada